Vladislav Aleksandrovich Blintsov (born 5 April 1996) is a Russian sprint canoeist.

He participated at the 2018 ICF Canoe Sprint World Championships.

References

1996 births
Russian male canoeists
Living people
ICF Canoe Sprint World Championships medalists in kayak
Canoeists at the 2015 European Games
European Games medalists in canoeing
European Games silver medalists for Russia